Christina K. "Jess" Hartley (born December 11, 1967) is an American novelist, writer, game creator, and editor.

Hartley is the author of the novel Exalted: In Northern Twilight published by White Wolf Publishing, and Little Yoshida, a novel published as an electronic serial, by Mind Storm Labs. She has been an author of, and contributing writer to, nearly forty role-playing games and game products (RPG) books from White Wolf Publishing/CCP North America, and Margaret Weis Productions, as well as the editor for several projects from Steampower Publishing and Rogue Games.

From 2002 to 2005, Hartley produced the ongoing feature article, Forsoothly Spoken, for Renaissance Magazine as well as doing book reviews for the publication.

In August 2009, Hartley debuted One Geek To Another, an advice, ethics and etiquette blog for the geek community. In 2010, One Geek To Another was nominated for an ENnie Award in the category of Best Blog.

Hartley was born in San Rafael, California and raised in the Willamette Valley of Oregon. She lived for several years in Easthampton, Massachusetts and then in Bisbee, Arizona. In October 2010, she returned to her native NW, and now resides in Gresham, Oregon.

Current projects
 The Shattered Glass Project - An urban fairy tale story and an experiment in patronage sponsored art.

Published works

Novels
 Little Yoshida (2010) PDF Download
 Exalted: In Northern Twilight (2004)

Short stories and anthologies
 Hunger's Child, in Human Tales (2011) 
 To Duty Bound, in The Crimson Pact, Volume 1 (2011) 
 Stigmatized Property, in Buried Tales of Pinebox, Texas (2009)

Essays and nonfiction
 Rolling In the Aisles, in Bones: Us and Our Dice (2010) 
 Zooloretto, in Family Games: The 100 Best (2010) 
 Conventions for the Aspiring Game Professional (2009) PDF Download

Role-playing games and supplements
 The Fear-Maker's Promise Compendium (2011) 
 Supernatural Adventures (2010) 
 Goblin Markets (Changeling: The Lost) (2010) PDF Download
 City in the Sand (Mind's Eye Theater – Vampire: The Requiem) (2010) PDF Download
 Personae – Ready Made Characters (Changeling: The Lost) (2009) PDF Download
 Nosferatu – The Beast That Hunts The Blood (Vampire: The Requiem) (2009) 
 Geist: The Sin-Eaters (2009) 
 Collection of Horrors: No Escape (Hunter: The Vigil) (2009) PDF Download
 Slashers (Hunter: The Vigil) (2009) 
 Swords at Dawn (Changeling: The Lost) (2009) 
 Dancers in the Dusk (Changeling: The Lost) (2009) 
 The Selfish Succubus (Instant Antagonists) (2009) PDF Download
 The Rose-Bride's Plight (Changeling: The Lost) (2008) PDF Download
 Innocents (World of Darkness)(2008) 
 Scion: God (Scion)(2008) 
 Rites of Spring (Changeling: The Lost)(2008) 
 Midnight Roads (World of Darkness) (2008) 
 Lords of Summer (Changeling: The Lost) (2008) 
 The Silver Ladder (Mage: The Awakening) (2008) 
 Hunter: The Vigil (2008) 
 Witch Finders (Hunter: The Vigil) (2008) 
 Autumn Nightmares (Changeling: The Lost) (2007) 
 Reliquary (World of Darkness) (2007) 
 The Mysterium (Mage: The Awakening) (2007) 
 The Free Council (Mage: The Awakening) (2007) 
 Changeling: The Lost (2007) 
 Scion: Demigod (Scion) (2007) 
 Saturnine Nights (Promethean: The Created) (2007) 
 Magnum Opus (Promethean: The Created) (2007) 
 Strange Alchemies (Promethean: The Created) (2006) 
 Pandoras Book (Promethean: The Created) (2006) 
 Compass of the Celestial Directions 1 – The Blessed Isle (Exalted) (2006) 
 Skinchangers (World of Darkness) (2006) 
 Predators (Werewolf: The Forsaken) (2005)

Editing and development roles
 Reliquary (World of Darkness for White Wolf Publishing – Developer (2008)
 The Future Soldier's Battlefield Handbook for Steampower Publishing – Editor (2007)
 The Lemurian Candidate for Steampower Publishing – Editor (2006)

Media mentions
Jess Hartley has appeared in the following newspaper and magazine articles, websites and podcasts.

Websites and blogs
 Flames Rising: Interviewed with Eddy Webb, Monica Valentinelli and Kelley Barnes on 7 April 2011; The Shattered Glass Project on 21 March 2010; Guest Blog – 13 Halloween Etiquette Tips From One Geek To Another; Interviewed on August 13, 2008 by Jeremy Jones: Jess Hartley, Freelance Author & Editor Interview
 The Successful Dilettante: Interviewed on April 20, 2007 by Susan Henderson.
 The Escapist: Appeared on Tell Me About Your Character on May 19, 2006.

Podcasts
 RPG Countdown: Jess appeared on the following episodes: 22 April 2009 (Collection of Horrors), 15 July 2009 (Ready-Made Player Characters (Changeling: The Lost)), 12 August 2009 (City in the Sand), 9 September 2009 (Geist: The Sin-Eaters).
 Tri Tac Games Podcast: Jess appeared on the following episodes: 14 March 2011 (Episode 61: Gender Issues with Jess Hartley).
 Fear The Boot Jess appeared on the following episodes: 29 July 2007 (Interview Episode 4 – Changeling: The Lost)

Video appearances
 GamesU 2009: Women in Gaming panel, featuring Jess Hartley, Monica Valentinelli and Juliet Meyers, 2009 
 Planet Access. Live Video Interview Recorded at Connecticon 2007.

References

External links
 Jess Hartley Official Web site
 
 Amazon.com Author List
 Interview at FlamesRising.com
 

1967 births
Living people
21st-century American novelists
American fantasy writers
American women novelists
Clark College alumni
People from Bisbee, Arizona
People from Gresham, Oregon
Role-playing game designers
White Wolf game designers
Novelists from Arizona
Novelists from Oregon
Writers from San Rafael, California
Women science fiction and fantasy writers
21st-century American women writers
Role-playing game writers
Electronic literature writers